Alcaligenes piechaudii is a bacterium; its type strain is CIP 60.75 (= Hugh 366-5 = IAM 12591 = LMG 1873). It is rod-shaped, aerobic, Gram negative, unpigmented, and motile by peritrichous flagella. It is found in humans and in the environment.

References

Further reading

External links
Genus Alcaligenes. LPSN, bacterio.net

Burkholderiales
Bacteria described in 1986